Patricia Lee Stotter is an American composer and writer.

Television work
Sesame Street
HBO documentaries: Unchained Memories, Reading Your Heart Out, Sometimes I Feel, Three Sisters
PBS documentaries:"Service: When Women Come Marching Home", Spirit to Spirit, Discovering Women, Sugar
Dramas on NBC, CBS and ABC

Film work
 Interplay
We Are All Prisoners
Fatal Fandango
Battlefield: Home
SERVICE: When Women Come Marching Home   www.servicethefilm.com
Justice Denied
Is Anybody Listening? www.paulajcaplan.net
Suicide Notes
Sea Women
"Three Sisters"
Dramatic Need
The Salt Harvesters of Ghana
Warriors Return     marciarock.com/2013/11/12/warriors-return/ 
Bankers Brain www.youtube.com
From the Ashes
Unfinished Business
Funny
Unchained Memories
Best Friends:Sisterhood
Dads and Daughters
Painting the Town
Spirit to Spirit
"Starving for Sugar"

Theatre
She has composed incidental music and full scores for over 50 plays and musicals including:
"Carbondale Dreams"
"Beef"
"Resistance"
Anna, the Gypsy Swede
Threads
Perfect Pitch

Awards 
 Emmy Award 
 NY Emmy Award 
 American Cine Eagle
 Apple Award
 ASCAP Popular Awards
 Sundance Film Festival
 Tribeca Film Festival
 Museum of Modern Art Film Festival

References 

American women composers
21st-century American composers
Living people
Year of birth missing (living people)
Place of birth missing (living people)
21st-century American women musicians
21st-century women composers